El poder de las mujeres is a 2000 album by Ashley.

Track listing 
 Calle Calle
 El Poder de las Mujeres
 Corazon Prohibido
 Una Noche Bomba
 Ese Nene me Domina
 Sangre Caliente
 La Chica Bomba
 Mentiroso
 Zuku Zuku
 Calle Calle (long Version)

Ashley (singer) albums
2000 albums